Matchbox is a 2002 Greek drama film directed by Yannis Economides.

Cast 
 Errikos Litsis - Dimitris
 Eleni Kokkidou - Maria
 Costas Xikominos - Giorgos
 Giannis Voulgarakis - Vangelis
 Ioanna Ivanoudi - Margarita
 Stavros Yagoulis - Loukas
 Angeliki Papoulia - Kiki

References

External links 

2003 drama films
2003 films
Films about dysfunctional families
Greek drama films